Joy Silk was a doctrine of the US National Labor Relations Board in effect from 1949 to 1966. The doctrine arose from Joy Silk Mills, Inc., 85 NLRB 1263 (1949) and was replaced by the Gissel doctrine after NLRB v. Gissel Packing Co. (1969). The doctrine holds that "if a union provides evidence that a majority of workers want to unionize", the employer should voluntarily recognize the union by default unless they have "good faith doubt" regarding that evidence. Further, "if there’s an unfair labor practice, meaning the employer broke the law, then it is presumed that the workers wanted to join a union".

Jennifer Abruzzo has proposed reinstating the Joy Silk standard, which would make it easier for workers to unionize. According to law professor Risa Lieberwitz, "bringing Joy Silk back would be a doctrine that more fully respects workers' rights to unionize."

References

Further reading

External links
Joy Silk Mills, Inc., 85 NLRB 1263 (1949) 

United States labor law
National Labor Relations Board